Justice Jacobs may refer to:

Jack B. Jacobs (fl. 2000s–2010s), associate justice of the Delaware Supreme Court
Nathan L. Jacobs (1905–1989), associate justice of the New Jersey Supreme Court
Orange Jacobs (1827–1914), chief justice of the Territory of Washington

See also
Stephen Jacob (1755–1817), sometimes misspelled as "Jacob", associate justice of the Vermont Supreme Court
Judge Jacobs (disambiguation)